Bahiya Al Aradi  (? – 16 March 2011) was the first woman killed in the Bahraini Uprising. 
She is notable as the first female victim in the Bahraini Uprising. She has been called a shaheeda, or female martyr, by her family.

On March 16, the government allowed her brother to visit her for a few minutes in Bahrain Defense Force Hospital (Bahrain Royal Medical Services).

She died on hospital from injuries she received when she was hit in the back by birdshot pellets fired from a range of 50 to 75 meters.
On March 20, the hospital announced that she had died of her injuries. At least one bullet had entered al-Aradi's head from behind. There was no exit wound.

Personal life
Al Aradi was never married.

See also
Death of Fadhel Al-Matrook
Bloody Thursday
Death of Ahmed Jaber al-Qattan

References

2011 deaths
2011 in Bahrain
Police brutality in Bahrain
Bahraini uprising of 2011
Deaths by firearm in Bahrain
Deaths during the Bahraini uprising of 2011
Protest-related deaths
Police brutality in the 2010s